Harry James Angus (born 11 June 1982 Melbourne) is an Australian singer-songwriter, trumpet player and guitarist. He was one of the lead vocalists in the Melbourne band The Cat Empire along with Felix Riebl.  He joined the group in early 2000 and left when the original line-up disbanded in 2021. He is the nephew of comedian, actress and writer, Mary-Anne Fahey (famous for playing Kylie Mole on The Comedy Company).

History
Angus has been playing trumpet since the age of twelve and learnt to scat from listening to the Jazz greats. He went to primary school at Malvern Primary School, where he would often perform as a vocalist at school assemblies. He then went to high school at McKinnon Secondary College and was taught by Ian Orr in Melbourne before studying at the Victorian College of the Arts. In 2006, he appeared twice as a panelist on the ABC Australian Music Quiz show Spicks and Specks. Angus is also part of The Conglomerate, a four-piece Melbourne jazz band. He also played basketball for the Malvern Tigers Basketball Club, and used to wear the club's black and yellow singlet while performing at gigs.
He is married to Emily Lubitz, the lead singer of Tinpan Orange.

Jackson Jackson
His current side project, Jackson Jackson, is a partnership with producer and film composer Jan Skubiszewski (Two Hands, The Rage in Placid Lake, Last Man Standing). "Jackson Jackson and the New Apocalypso Beat" features Melbourne trio "The Genie" (composed of Ollie McGill on keyboards and keytar, Ryan Monro on bass and Will Hull-Brown on drums). His backing singers are known as "The Jackson Jackson 5" (comprising Elana Stone, Karishma Sadhai, Bec Ari, Chantal Mitvalsky and Rory Osman). Jackson Jackson are signed to EMI and their debut album The Fire Is on the Bird was released in March 2007.

Jackson Jackson played shows in Melbourne, Sydney and Brisbane in mid-March 2007 as part of their "Sneak Preview" tour.

In 2008 they released their second album Tools for Survival.

Other projects
Angus is a member of The Conglomerate, and plays trumpet on four tracks of the debut album Aroona Palace by Tinpan Orange, which also features Ollie McGill.

He has also released two folk/acoustic solo albums, Live at the Famous Spiegeltent in 2008, and Little Stories in 2011.

In 2012 Angus wrote the club song for the newest club in the AFL, the Greater Western Sydney Giants.

Awards and nominations

National Live Music Awards
The National Live Music Awards (NLMAs) are a broad recognition of Australia's diverse live industry, celebrating the success of the Australian live scene. The awards commenced in 2016.

|-
| National Live Music Awards of 2018
| Harry James Angus
| Best Live Voice of the Year - People's Choice
| 
|-

Discography

The Cat Empire
 "The Cat Empire" (2003)
 "Two Shoes" (2005)
 "Cities: The Cat Empire Project" (2006)
 "So Many Nights" (2007)
 "Live on Earth" (2009)
 "Cinema" (2010)
 "Steal the Light" (2013)
 "Rising with the Sun" (2016)
 "Stolen Diamonds" (2019)

Jackson Jackson
 The Fire Is on the Bird (2007)
 Tools For Survival (2008)

The Conglomerate
 Go to the Beach
 Hold Your Breath

With Tinpan Orange
 Aroona Palace (2005)
 The Bottom of the Lake (2009) (producer, also plays harmonium, piano, whistles, keyboard, percussion, guitar)

Solo albums
 Live at the Famous Spiegeltent (2008)
 Little Stories (2011)
 Struggle With Glory (2018)

See also
 The Cat Empire

References

External links
 Cat Empire Info
 Harry Angus – Unofficial fan site

Living people
Australian trumpeters
1982 births
Australian singer-songwriters
21st-century trumpeters
21st-century Australian male musicians
21st-century Australian musicians
The Cat Empire members
Australian male singer-songwriters
Musicians from Melbourne
Australian male rappers